The girls' individual competition of the ski jumping events at the 2012 Winter Youth Olympics in Innsbruck, Austria, was held on January 14, at the Toni-Seelos-Olympiaschanze. 14 athletes from 14 different countries took part in this event.

Results 
The first round was started on 14 January at 11:00 and the final round at 12:00.

References 

 

Ski jumping at the 2012 Winter Youth Olympics